Denis Gavini (8 October 1820, Campile, Haute-Corse - 2 March 1916) was a French Bonapartist politician. He was a member of the National Legislative Assembly from 1849 to 1851, of the National Assembly from 1871 to 1876 and of the Chamber of Deputies from 1876 to 1885. He sat with the Appel au peuple parliamentary group.

References

1820 births
1916 deaths
People from Haute-Corse
Corsican politicians
Appel au peuple
Members of the National Legislative Assembly of the French Second Republic
Members of the National Assembly (1871)
Members of the 1st Chamber of Deputies of the French Third Republic
Members of the 2nd Chamber of Deputies of the French Third Republic
Members of the 3rd Chamber of Deputies of the French Third Republic
Members of the 4th Chamber of Deputies of the French Third Republic